List of incorporated villages in Wisconsin, arranged in alphabetical order. As of January 1, 2021, there were 415 villages in Wisconsin.


List of villages

See also 
 List of cities in Wisconsin
 List of municipalities in Wisconsin by population
 List of towns in Wisconsin
 Political subdivisions of Wisconsin

References

External links
 League of Wisconsin Municipalities. Estimated Population per Square Mile of Land Area, Wisconsin Municipalities  
 Wisconsin Department of Administration. List of Wisconsin Municipalities in Alphabetical Order
 Wisconsin Department of Health Services. Wisconsin Cities, Villages, Townships and Unincorporated Places Listing
 Wisconsin Legislative Reference Bureau. State of Wisconsin Blue Book 2013-2014 - state and local government statistics

 
Villages
Wisconsin